123rd may refer to:

123rd Battalion (Royal Grenadiers), CEF, a unit in the Canadian Expeditionary Force during the First World War
123rd Contingency Response Group, a unit of the 123rd Airlift Wing, Kentucky Air National Guard
123rd Delaware General Assembly, a meeting of the Delaware Senate and the Delaware House of Representatives
123rd Illinois Volunteer Infantry Regiment, an infantry regiment that served in the Union Army during the American Civil War
123rd IOC Session, scheduled to be held in 2011 in Durban, South Africa, to decide the host city of the 2018 Winter Olympic Games
123rd meridian east, a line of longitude 123° east of Greenwich
123rd meridian west, a line of longitude 123° west of Greenwich
123rd Outram's Rifles, an infantry regiment of the British Indian Army
123rd Regiment of Foot (1762), an infantry regiment of the British Army, formed in 1762 and disbanded in 1764
123rd Regiment of Foot (Loyal Lincolnshire), an infantry regiment of the British Army, formed in 1794 and disbanded in 1796
123rd Street station, a railroad station in Blue Island, Illinois
Ohio 123rd General Assembly, the legislative body of the state of Ohio in 1999 and 2000
Polish 123rd Fighter Escadrille, one of the fighter units of the Polish Army in 1939

See also
123 (number)
123, the year 123 (CXXIII) of the Julian calendar